Deutscheinsiedel is a village in the Saxon municipality of Deutschneudorf in the district of Erzgebirgskreis in East Germany.

References

Sources 
 
 Landratsamt Mittlerer Erzgebirgskreis, Hrsg.: Zur Geschichte der Städte und Gemeinden im Mittleren Erzgebirgskreis, Eine Zeittafel (parts 1-3)
 Neue Dörfer In: Die böhmischen Exulanten in Sachsen, Christian Adolf Pescheck, Leipzig bei S. Hirzel, 1857, p. 104–107 (Digitalisat)

External links 
 

Erzgebirgskreis